Martin Chudý (born 23 April 1989) is a Slovak footballer who play as a goalkeeper for Concordia Chiajna in the Romanian Liga II.

Club career
Chudý joined Dukla Prague in June 2014. He was transferred to Teplice in January 2016 due to weight problems.

Honours
Spartak Trnava
 Fortuna Liga: 2017–18

References

External links

1989 births
Living people
Sportspeople from Považská Bystrica
Slovak footballers
Slovak expatriate footballers
Slovakia youth international footballers
Slovakia under-21 international footballers
Association football goalkeepers
FC Nitra players
FC Sellier & Bellot Vlašim players
FK Dukla Prague players
FK Teplice players
FC Spartak Trnava players
Górnik Zabrze players
ŠKF Sereď players
CS Concordia Chiajna players
Liga II players
Slovak Super Liga players
Czech First League players
Czech National Football League players
Ekstraklasa players
Expatriate footballers in the Czech Republic
Expatriate footballers in Romania
Expatriate footballers in Poland
Slovak expatriate sportspeople in the Czech Republic
Slovak expatriate sportspeople in Poland
Slovak expatriate sportspeople in Romania